The eighth season of the Russian reality talent show The Voice Kids premiered on 12 February 2021 on Channel One. Dmitry Nagiev and Agata Muceniece returned as the show's presenters. Basta returned as a coach, LOBODA returned as a coach after a one-season break and replaced Polina Gagarina, Egor Kreed replaced Valery Meladze and became a new coach for the show. Vladislav Tyukin was announced the winner on April 30th 2021, marking LOBODA's first win as the coach and the second female coach to win in the show's history.

Coaches and presenters

There were two changes to the coaching panel. Basta was joined by LOBODA, who returned after a one-season break and Egor Kreed as a new coach.

Dmitry Nagiev and Agata Muceniece returned as the show's presenters.

Teams
Colour key

Blind Auditions 
Colour key

The Battles 
The Battles start on April 2, 2021. Contestants who won their battle advanced to the Sing-off rounds.
Colour key

The Sing-offs 
The Sing-offs start on April 2. Contestants who was saved by their coaches advanced to the Final.
Colour key

Live shows
Colour key

Week 1: Live Playoffs (April 23)
As with season 2, each coach saved three artists who were eliminated in the Sing-offs.
Playoff results were voted on in real time. Nine artists sang live and six of them were eliminated by the end of the night.
Three saved artists advanced to the Final.

Week 2: Final (April 30)

Best Coach
Colour key

Notes

References

8
2021 Russian television seasons